Lennon–McCartney was the songwriting partnership between English musicians John Lennon (1940–1980) and Paul McCartney (born 1942) of the Beatles. It is the best-known and most successful musical collaboration ever by records sold, with the Beatles selling over 600 million records worldwide as of 2004. Between 5 October 1962 and 8 May 1970, the partnership published approximately 180 jointly credited songs, of which the vast majority were recorded by the Beatles, forming the bulk of their catalogue.

Unlike many songwriting partnerships that comprise a separate lyricist and composer, such as George and Ira Gershwin, Richard Rodgers and Oscar Hammerstein, or Elton John and Bernie Taupin, both Lennon and McCartney wrote lyrics and music. Sometimes, especially early on, they would collaborate extensively when writing songs, working "eyeball to eyeball" as Lennon phrased it. During the latter half of their partnership, it became more common for either of them to write most of a song on their own with minimal input from the other, and sometimes none at all. By an agreement made before the Beatles became famous, Lennon and McCartney were credited equally with songs that either one of them wrote while their partnership lasted.

Lennon–McCartney compositions have been the subject of numerous cover versions. According to Guinness World Records, "Yesterday" has been recorded by more musicians than any other song.

Meeting
Although McCartney had previously seen and noticed Lennon in the local area without knowing who he was, the pair first met on 6 July 1957, at a local church fête, where 16-year-old Lennon was playing with his skiffle group the Quarrymen. The 15-year-old McCartney, brought along by a mutual friend, Ivan Vaughan, impressed Lennon with his ability on the guitar and his version of Eddie Cochran's "Twenty Flight Rock". Soon afterwards, Lennon asked McCartney if he would join the Quarrymen; McCartney accepted. The duo's first musical idols were the Everly Brothers, Little Richard, Chuck Berry, Elvis Presley, Buddy Holly, and Smokey Robinson and the Miracles, and they learned many of their songs and imitated their sound. Their first compositions were written at McCartney's home (20 Forthlin Road), at Lennon's aunt Mimi's house (251 Menlove Avenue), or at the Liverpool Institute. They often invited friends—including George Harrison, Nigel Walley, Barbara Baker, and Lennon's art school colleagues—to listen to performances of their new songs.

Writing chemistry
Lennon said the main intention of the Beatles' music was to communicate, and that, to this effect, he and McCartney had a shared purpose. Author David Rowley points out that at least half of all Lennon–McCartney lyrics have the words "you" and/or "your" in the first line. In Lennon's 1980 Playboy interview, he said of the partnership:

Historian Todd Compton has noted that there is some truth to Lennon's statement regarding McCartney's optimism. However, it does not tell the whole story, as some of McCartney's most characteristic songs are tragic, or express themes of isolation, such as "Yesterday", "She's Leaving Home", "Eleanor Rigby" or "For No One".

Although Lennon and McCartney often wrote independently—and many Beatles songs are primarily the work of one or the other—it was rare that a song would be completed without some input from both writers. In many instances, one writer would sketch an idea or a song fragment and take it to the other to finish or improve; in some cases, two incomplete songs or song ideas that each had worked on individually would be combined into a complete song. Often one of the pair would add a middle eight or bridge section to the other's verse and chorus. George Martin attributed the high quality of their songwriting to the friendly rivalry between the two. This approach of the Lennon–McCartney songwriting team—with elements of competitiveness and mutual inspiration as well as straightforward collaboration and creative merging of musical ideas—is often cited as a key reason for the Beatles' innovation and popular success.

As time went on, the songs increasingly became the work of one writer or the other, often with the partner offering up only a few words or an alternative chord. "A Day in the Life" is a well-known example of a later Beatles song that includes substantial contributions by both Lennon and McCartney, where a separate song fragment by McCartney ("Woke up, fell out of bed, dragged a comb across my head ...") was used to flesh out the middle of Lennon's composition ("I read the news today, oh boy ..."). "Hey Jude" is another example of a later McCartney song that had input from Lennon: while auditioning the song for Lennon, when McCartney came to the lyric "the movement you need is on your shoulder", McCartney assured Lennon that he would change the line—which McCartney felt was nonsensical—as soon as he could come up with a better lyric. Lennon advised McCartney to leave that line alone, saying it was one of the strongest in the song.

Though Lennon and McCartney’s collaborative efforts decreased in later years, they continued to influence one another. As Lennon stated in 1969, “We write how we write now because of each other. Paul was there for five or ten years, and I wouldn't write like I write now if it weren't for Paul, and he wouldn't write like he does if it weren't for me.”

Credit variations and disputes

Joint credit
When McCartney and Lennon met as teenagers and began writing songs together, they agreed that all songs written by them (whether individually or jointly) should be credited to both of them. The precise date of the agreement is unknown; however, Lennon spoke in 1980 of an informal agreement between him and McCartney made "when we were fifteen or sixteen". Two songs written (primarily by Lennon) in 1957, "Hello Little Girl" and "One After 909", were credited to the partnership when published in the following decade. The earliest Beatles recording credited to Lennon–McCartney to be officially released is "You'll Be Mine", recorded at home in 1960 and included on Anthology 1 35 years later.

Some other compositions from the band's early years are not credited to the partnership. "In Spite of All the Danger", a 1958 composition that the band (then The Quarrymen) paid to record to disc, is attributed to McCartney and George Harrison. "Cayenne", recorded at the same time as "You'll Be Mine", is a solo McCartney composition. "Cry for a Shadow", an instrumental recorded during the Beatles' sessions with Tony Sheridan in June 1961 (one of the only full instrumentals the group recorded), was written by Harrison and Lennon.

By 1962, the joint credit agreement was in effect. From the time of the Beatles' A&R Decca audition in January that year, until Lennon's announcement in September 1969 that he was leaving the band, virtually all songs by McCartney or Lennon were published with joint credit, although, on a few of their first releases, the order was reversed (see below). The only other exceptions were a handful of the McCartney compositions released by other musicians (viz. "Woman" by Peter and Gordon in 1966 (McCartney using Bernard Webb as a pseudonym), "Cat Call" by Chris Barber in 1967, and "Penina" by Carlos Mendes in 1969). Lennon kept the joint credit for "Give Peace a Chance", his first single with the Plastic Ono Band.

After the partnership had ended, Lennon and McCartney each gave various accounts of their individual contribution to each jointly credited song, and sometimes claimed full authorship. Often their memories of collaboration differed, and often their own early and late interviews are in conflict. In 1977, Lennon offered Hit Parader a list of Beatles songs with comments regarding his and McCartney's contributions to each song. In his response to the article at the time, McCartney disputed only one of Lennon's entries.

 "Help!" (1965)
 Lennon described the song as co-written in 1965 interviews. In late interviews, he claimed full authorship. McCartney's stated help was on the "countermelody", estimating the song as "70–30" to Lennon. In 1984, McCartney said "John and I wrote it at his house in Weybridge for the film."

 "Ticket to Ride" (1965)
 In 1965, Lennon claimed that the song was "three-quarters mine and Paul changed it a bit. He said let's alter the tune." However, in 1980, Lennon said that McCartney's contribution was limited to "the way Ringo played the drums". In Many Years from Now, McCartney said "we sat down and wrote it together ... give him 60 percent of it."

 "In My Life" (1965)
 Lennon's entry for "In My Life" was the only one that McCartney disputed in his response to the Hit Parader article. Lennon said that McCartney helped only with "the middle eight" (a short section) of the song. McCartney said that he wrote the entire melody, taking inspiration from Smokey Robinson songs.

 "Eleanor Rigby" (1966) 
 In the 1997 biography Many Years from Now, McCartney recalled writing the music to "Eleanor Rigby" on a piano at Jane Asher's family home in Wimpole Street, and then playing it to Donovan, who supported that the song lacked any serious lyrics at that point. In 1972, Lennon said that he wrote 70 percent of the lyrics, but Pete Shotton, Lennon's childhood friend, remembered Lennon's contribution as being "absolutely nil". In 1985, McCartney said that Lennon had contributed "about half a line" to the song, but elsewhere (including a 1966 interview) he describes finishing the song with more substantial collaboration with Lennon. Harrison also contributed to this song. According to journalist Hunter Davies, the last verse was finished with all the Beatles giving suggestions in the studio.

 "And Your Bird Can Sing" (1966)
 McCartney claimed to have helped on the lyric, estimating the song as "80–20" to Lennon. In Hit Parader, Lennon did not acknowledge any contributions from McCartney.

 "Being for the Benefit of Mr. Kite" (1967)
 In Hit Parader, Lennon said he authored the song and took the words from a circus poster. He did not acknowledge McCartney as a contributor. In 2013, McCartney recalled spending an afternoon with Lennon writing the song based on the poster: "I read, occasionally, people say, 'Oh, John wrote that one.' I say, 'Wait a minute, what was that afternoon I spent with him, then, looking at this poster?'"

Lennon–McCartney vs McCartney–Lennon
In October 1962, the Beatles released their first single in the UK, "Love Me Do", credited to "Lennon–McCartney". However, on their next three releases the following year (the single "Please Please Me", the Please Please Me LP, and the single "From Me to You"), the credit was given as "McCartney–Lennon". With the "She Loves You" single, released in August 1963, the credit reverted to "Lennon–McCartney", and all subsequent official Beatles singles and albums list "Lennon–McCartney" (UK) or "John Lennon-Paul McCartney" (US) as the author of songs written by the two.

In 1976 McCartney's band Wings released their live album Wings over America with songwriting credits for five Beatles songs reversed to place McCartney's name first. Neither Lennon nor Yoko Ono publicly "voiced a word of disapproval about it". Many years after Lennon's death however, in the late 1990s, McCartney and Ono became involved in a dispute over the credit order. McCartney's 2002 live album, Back in the U.S., also used the credit "Paul McCartney and John Lennon" for all of the Beatles songs. When Ono objected to McCartney's request for the reversed credit to be used for the 1965 song "Yesterday", McCartney said that he and Lennon had agreed in the past that the credits could be reversed, if either of them wanted to, on any future releases. In 2003, he relented, saying, "I'm happy with the way it is and always has been. Lennon and McCartney is still the rock 'n' roll trademark I'm proud to be a part of – in the order it has always been." An in-depth analysis of the legal issues was the subject of a 66-page article in the Pepperdine Law Review in 2006.

Lennon–McCartney and others

A number of songs written primarily by the duo and recorded by the Beatles were credited as follows:
"What Goes On" (1965): Lennon–McCartney–Starkey
"12-Bar Original" (1965): Lennon–McCartney–Harrison–Starkey
"Flying" (1967): Harrison–Lennon–McCartney–Starkey
"Jessie's Dream" (1967): Lennon–McCartney–Harrison–Starkey
"Los Paranoias" (1968): Lennon–McCartney–Harrison–Starkey
"Dig It" (1969): Lennon–McCartney–Harrison–Starkey
"Maggie Mae" (1969): Arrangement by Lennon–McCartney–Harrison–Starkey
"Suzy Parker" (1969): Lennon–McCartney–Harrison–Starkey
"Free as a Bird" (1995): Original composition by John Lennon; Beatles version credited to John Lennon, Paul McCartney, George Harrison and Ringo Starr
"Christmas Time (Is Here Again)" (1995 edit of 1967 fan club version): Lennon–McCartney–Harrison–Starkey

The German-language versions of "I Want to Hold Your Hand" and "She Loves You" were also credited to additional songwriters for assisting with the translation. "Komm, Gib Mir Deine Hand" was credited to Lennon–McCartney–Nicolas–Hellmer, and "Sie Liebt Dich" was credited to Lennon–McCartney–Nicolas–Montague.

Legacy

Cultural impact

Lennon–McCartney, as well as other British Invasion songwriters, inspired changes to the music industry because they were bands that wrote and performed their own music. This trend threatened the professional songwriters that dominated the American music industry. Ellie Greenwich, a Brill Building songwriter, said, “When the Beatles and the entire British Invasion came in, we were all ready to say, ‘Look, it’s been nice, there’s no more room for us… It’s now the self-contained group- makes, certain type of material. What do we do?" In 1963, The Sunday Times called Lennon and McCartney the greatest composers since Ludwig van Beethoven.

The Lennon–McCartney brand would prove to be a model for several other songwriting teams in the rock genre, including, according to Lennon, the Rolling Stones' Jagger–Richards partnership. Subsequent Beatlesque songwriting teams, sometimes featuring former Beatles, attracted comparisons in the media to Lennon–McCartney. The new wave band Squeeze's partnership of Chris Difford and Glenn Tilbrook was infamously dubbed the "new Lennon–McCartney" by music writers. Difford and Tilbrook expressed ambivalence about the comparison: Tilbrook felt that they "got a bit pompous" as a result, while Difford noted that, although the tag was "very useful" to Squeeze for getting the attention of radio programmers, the label "might have been a burden" on Tilbrook "because he had to live up to the challenge of [the Beatles'] kind of songwriting, which he didn't need to do because he's such an incredible songwriter in his own right." Similarly, when McCartney teamed up with Elvis Costello in 1989, Costello's acerbic style earned him comparisons to Lennon in his role as McCartney's collaborator. McCartney, despite conceding that Costello has "got a bit of Lennon in him", characterized the pairing as "a new thing".

Beatles catalogue
The Lennon–McCartney songwriting partnership makes up the majority of the Beatles' catalogue. The first two UK studio albums included 12 cover tunes and 15 Lennon–McCartney songs, with one track ("Don't Bother Me") credited to George Harrison. Their third UK album, A Hard Day's Night (1964), is the only original Beatles album made up entirely of Lennon–McCartney compositions. The next album released, Beatles for Sale (1964), included six covers and eight Lennon–McCartney originals. The subsequent release, Help! (1965), had two covers and two Harrison compositions along with ten Lennon–McCartney tracks; it was the last Beatles album to feature a non-original composition until Let It Be, which included an arrangement of the traditional Liverpool folk song "Maggie Mae". Among the songs in this post-Help! output, Harrison contributed between one and four songs per album, and Starr wrote two songs in total and received a joint credit with Lennon and McCartney for a third ("What Goes On"). In addition, "Flying" and "Dig It" were credited to all four Beatles. The rest of the catalogue came from Lennon and McCartney.

Lennon and McCartney gave songs to Starr to sing, and to Harrison before he started writing his own material. As for the songs they kept for themselves, each partner mostly sang his own composition, often with the other providing harmonies, or they shared lead vocal. If each contributed a fragment to make a whole song, he might sing his portion, as in the case of "I've Got a Feeling" and "A Day in the Life". "Every Little Thing" is a rare example of a Lennon–McCartney song in which one member of the partnership was primary composer (McCartney) but the other sang lead vocal (Lennon). McCartney sings in unison with Lennon on the verses, but Lennon's vocal is more prominent. McCartney sings the high harmony on the chorus.

In January 2017, McCartney filed a suit in United States district court against Sony/ATV Music Publishing seeking to reclaim ownership of his share of the Lennon–McCartney song catalogue beginning in 2018. Under US copyright law, for works published before 1978 the author can reclaim copyrights assigned to a publisher after 56 years. McCartney and Sony agreed to a confidential settlement in June 2017.

Non-Beatles songs
Several songs credited to Lennon–McCartney were originally released by bands other than the Beatles, especially those managed by Brian Epstein. Recording a Lennon–McCartney song helped launch new performing-artists' careers. Many of the recordings below were included on the 1979 compilation album The Songs Lennon and McCartney Gave Away. Beatles versions of some of these were recorded; some were not released until after their split, on compilations such as Live at the BBC (1994) and The Beatles Anthology (1995–96).

Four songs and a soundtrack album were released during this period but credited solely to Paul McCartney:

Unreleased songs

The following compositions are believed to have been written by Lennon and McCartney, but never officially released by the Beatles or any other artist except as noted below. Many have appeared on Beatles bootlegs, an exception being "Carnival of Light". The list of unreleased songs includes some of the earliest Lennon–McCartney joint works dating back to the Quarrymen, the group that evolved into the Beatles. Several of these songs were revisited during the Get Back sessions of early 1969.

See also
List of songs recorded by the Beatles
List of songwriter collaborations
The Beatles bootleg recordings
Jagger–Richards

References

Citations

Bibliography

External links
"Two of Us: Inside the Lennon/McCartney Connection", by Joshua Wolf Shenk, Slate.com
The Lennon-McCartney Songwriting Partnership
An Introduction to Compton's Who Wrote the Beatle Songs? A History of Lennon-McCartney, with a list of his ascriptions of all the songs written by the Beatles
Songs the Beatles Gave Away compiled by Joseph Brennan; includes Lennon–McCartney songs and others
A list of the songs John Lennon and Paul McCartney gave to other artists during the Beatle years originally posted on Usenet rec.music.beatles 9 November 1994.
Unreleased Beatles compositions showcased in Liverpool and Seattle, and on CD titled Off the Beatle Track (23 June 2009): http://www.prweb.com/releases/2009/06/prweb2550404.htm

History of the Beatles
The Beatles music
English musical duos
John Lennon
Paul McCartney
Musical groups established in 1962
Rock music duos
British songwriting teams
Male musical duos
1962 establishments in England